Tigers, London Zoological Gardens is a 1896 French short black-and-white silent actuality film, produced by Auguste and Louis Lumière and directed by Alexandre Promio, featuring two tigers reaching through the bars of its enclosure at London Zoological Gardens to get at the meat offered on a stick by their keeper. The film was part of a series, including Lion and Pelicans, which were one of the earliest examples of animal life on film.

References

1896 films
French black-and-white films
French silent short films
Films set in zoos
Films about tigers
1896 short films
1890s French films
Films shot in London